Czechoslovakia women's junior national softball team is the junior national team for Czechoslovakia. The team competed at the 1991 ISF Junior Women's World Championship in Adelaide, Australia where they had 1 win and 10 losses.

References

External links 
 International Softball Federation

Softball
Women's national under-18 softball teams
Softball in Czechoslovakia
Women's sport in Czechoslovakia
Youth sport in Czechoslovakia